Synchronized swimming was contested at the 2013 Summer Universiade from July 5 to 9 in Kazan, Russia. Synchronized swimming will be making its debut at the 2013 Summer Universiade.

Medal summary

Medal table

Medal events

References

External links
2013 Summer Universiade – Synchronized swimming
Results book

2013 Summer Universiade events
2013
2013 in synchronized swimming